Andrew Booth may refer to:

 Andy Booth (born 1973), English retired footballer 
 Andy Booth (racing driver) (born 1974), New Zealand racing driver
 Andrew Donald Booth (1918–2009), British physicist and computer engineer
 Andrew Booth (soccer) (born 1997), American-Jamaican soccer player
 Andrew Booth Jr. (born 2000), American football player
 Andy Booth, guitarist with The Cassandra Complex
 Andrew Booth, a character in the television show Monarch of the Glen